Tevhide Ilhamy (1860 — 1882) was an Egyptian princess and a member of the Muhammad Ali Dynasty.

Life
Princess Tevhide Ilhamy was born 1860 in Istanbul. She was the youngest daughter of Lieutenant General Prince Ibrahim Ilhami Pasha, and his consort Ashiq Bayran Qadin (died 1878). She was the granddaughter of Khedive Abbas I and Mahivech Hanim. She had two sisters, Princess Emina Ilhamy and Princess Zeynab Ilhamy. 

On 29 December 1880, she married Davut Fethi Pasha, a grandson of Mehmed Necib Pasha and had a son named Mustafa Davut Bey.

Death
Tevhide died at Cairo, Egypt in 1882.

Ancestry

References

1860 births
1882 deaths
Muhammad Ali dynasty
Royalty from Istanbul
Egyptian princesses